The 2019 First Data 500 was a Monster Energy NASCAR Cup Series race held on October 27, 2019, at Martinsville Speedway in Ridgeway, Virginia. Contested over 500 laps on the .526 mile (.847 km) short track (extended from 500 laps), it was the 33rd race of the 2019 Monster Energy NASCAR Cup Series season, seventh race of the Playoffs, and first race of the Round of 8.

Report

Background

Martinsville Speedway is an International Speedway Corporation-owned NASCAR stock car racing track located in Henry County, in Ridgeway, Virginia, just to the south of Martinsville. At  in length, it is the shortest track in the NASCAR Monster Energy Cup Series. The track is also one of the first paved oval tracks in NASCAR, being built in 1947 by H. Clay Earles. It is also the only race track that has been on the NASCAR circuit from its beginning in 1948. Along with this, Martinsville is the only NASCAR oval track on the entire NASCAR track circuit to have asphalt surfaces on the straightaways, then concrete to cover the turns.

Entry list
 (i) denotes driver who are ineligible for series driver points.
 (R) denotes rookie driver.

Matt Tifft was supposed to drive No. 36 car but he was hospitalized after suffering “a medical condition”. Matt Crafton was called to replace Tifft in the No. 36 car. Tifft has not raced in NASCAR since the hospitalization.

Practice

First practice

Final practice

Qualifying

Qualifying results

Race

Stage results

Stage One
Laps: 130

Stage Two
Laps: 130

Final stage results

Stage Three
Laps: 240

Race statistics
 Lead changes: 3 among 3 different drivers
 Cautions/Laps: 11 for 69
 Red flags: 0
 Time of race: 3 hours, 29 minutes and 9 seconds
 Average speed:

Media

Television
NBC Sports covered the race on the television side. Rick Allen, 1997 race winner Jeff Burton, Steve Letarte and 2014 race winner Dale Earnhardt Jr. had the call in the booth for the race. Parker Kligerman, Marty Snider and Kelli Stavast reported from pit lane during the race.

Radio
MRN covered the radio call for the race, which was simulcast on Sirius XM NASCAR Radio. Alex Hayden, Jeff Striegle, and 7 time Martinsville winner Rusty Wallace had the call for MRN when the field raced down the front straightaway. Dave Moody covered the action for MRN when the field raced down the backstraightway into turn 3. Winston Kelley, Steve Post, Kim Coon, and Dillon Welch had the call for MRN from pit lane.

Standings after the race

Manufacturers' Championship standings

Note: Only the first 16 positions are included for the driver standings.

References

First Data 500
First Data 500
NASCAR races at Martinsville Speedway
First Data 500